Hasan Ali Mansur (‎; 13 April 1923 – 26 January 1965) was an Iranian politician who served as Prime Minister from 1964 to 1965. He served during the White Revolution of the Shah Mohammad Reza Pahlavi and was assassinated by a member of the Fada'iyan-e Islam.

Early life and education 
Hassan Ali was born in Tehran on 13 April 1923 to Prime Minister Ali Mansur (Mansour-al-Molk) and daughter of Zahir-ol-Molk Raiss. He received primary education in Tehran and graduated from Firooz-Bahram High School. During the World War II era, he entered Law School at the University of Tehran and graduated with a degree in political science.

Career
In the post World War II era, Mansour started his political career by entering the foreign ministry and completed several internal and foreign assignments including tours of Germany and France. In the 1950s, this thirty-year-old was twice appointed chief of prime minister's office, first for a brief period because of change in government, and second lasted for 2 years. In 1957, Prime Minister Manuchehr Eghbal appointed him as chairman of the economics council and vice prime minister. He also held the positions of minister of labor, and minister of trade. Prime minister Asadollah Alam appointed him as chairman of "Bimeh Iran" insurance company.

The Progressive Party or "Kanoon Motaraghion" was founded by Mansour to conduct economic policy research as well as the launching pad for his future prime ministership.  In 1962 Mansour ran for the 21st Majlis and was elected as the second representative from Tehran, after Abdollah Riazi, speaker of the Majlis. A few dozen of his party members were also elected to Majlis, with the exception of Hoveyda and Kashefian who were more interested in executive branch. Mansour then expanded his power base by forming a coalition and founded "IRAN NOVIN" party with a majority of 175 out of 230 deputies, and was elected the Majority Leader of Parliament.

After Alam resigned his premiership in 1964, Mohammad Reza Pahlavi appointed Mansur prime minister and his cabinet was announced on 7 March. He introduced many young new faces, such as Amir Abbas Hoveyda, Jamshid Amuzegar, Ataollah Khosravani, Nahavandi, Alinaghi Alikhani, Manouchehr Rohani, and many other Iran Novin members. Since most of his cabinet were young and American/European educated, Mansour had pro-American tendencies in his politics and enjoyed the support of American government. Clearly the Shah now felt more comfortable working with people from his own generation than older generation who also served his father and called him "Shah Javan" or the "Young Shah".  The torch was passed from the old war heroes to younger educated technocrats to carry out the "White Revolution" and an explosive decade of growth.
 
Mansur passed the Geneva Convention American Force Protection Act, also known as the highly controversial Capitulation Law. This led to a fiery attack by Ayatollah Khomeini from Qom, and resulted in his historical exile to Turkey, and many subsequent riots. Mansur also raised the price of gasoline from 5 to 10 Rials to meet budget deficits, but later retreated after strikes by taxi drivers.

Personal life
Mansur was  briefly engaged to Noushie Teymourtash, but subsequently married Farideh Emami. He was survived by a son, the jazz guitarist Ahmad Mansur (1960–2011) and a daughter, the journalist Fati Mansur (1964). Farideh's sister Leyla Emami, later married prime minister Amir Abbas Hoveyda. Javad Mansur, his brother, also served as a consultant to prime minister Hoveyda. His sister Touran was briefly engaged to Fereydoun Hoveyda but subsequently married Manouchehr Teymourtash.

Assassination 

At 10am on 21 January 1965, a few days before the first anniversary of the White Revolution, Mansour was entering the gates of Majlis to present his first State-of-the-Union speech. After he stepped out of his car in Baharestan Square, he was shot three times by 21-year-old Mohammad Bokharaei, a member of Fada'iyan-e Islam. Bokharaei was later executed, along with three others implicated in the assassination – Reza Saffar Harandi, Haaj Sadegh Amani, and Morteza Niknejad.

Mansour was put back into the car and rushed to the hospital, where he remained in critical condition for 5 days before he finally died. During the crisis, the Shah quickly appointed Mansur's friend, Amir-Abbas Hoveida as the acting prime minister, in which role he continued for the next thirteen years. Mansour's assassination occurred a few years after the assassination of prime minister Ali Razmara.
 
Mansour was buried in Shah-Abdol-Azim near Reza Shah's mausoleum, and a Kennedy-like Black Granite Eternal Flame was constructed at his grave site. After the Islamic Revolution, the Mansur gravesite was destroyed by Ayatollah Khalkhali, and his remains were dug up and scattered.

References

 'Alí Rizā Awsatí (عليرضا اوسطى), Iran in the past three centuries (Irān dar Se Qarn-e Goz̲ashteh - ايران در سه قرن گذشته), Volumes 1 and 2 (Paktāb Publishing - انتشارات پاکتاب, Tehran, Iran, 2003).  (Vol. 1),  (Vol. 2).
 Biography of Recent Political and Military People of Iran, Bagher Agheli, Volume 3, p.1548, in Persian, Tehran 2001

External links

|-

1923 births
1965 deaths
Prime Ministers of Iran
Assassinated Iranian politicians
Iran Novin Party Secretaries-General
Mansur, Hassan Ali
Deaths by firearm in Iran
People murdered in Iran
Assassinated heads of government
20th-century Iranian people
Children of national leaders
People assassinated by the Fada'iyan-e Islam
Victims of Islamic terrorism